Koshksaray District is in Marand County, East Azerbaijan province, Iran. Koshksaray Rural District and the city of Koshksaray were separated from the Central District to establish the district in 2019. At the 2006 National Census, the region's population (as parts of the Central District) was 30,380 in 7,458 households. The following census in 2011 counted 30,896 people in 8,829 households. At the latest census in 2016, there were 31,882 inhabitants in 9,637 households.

References 

Marand County

Districts of East Azerbaijan Province

Populated places in East Azerbaijan Province

Populated places in Marand County

fa:بخش کشکسرای